'Norm Brunet is a Canadian singer-songwriter and instrumentalist.

Early life
Brunet was born in 1958 in the province of Quebec. He grew up and still lives in Ottawa, Ontario, and started playing guitar at the age of nine years old and wrote his first song at fifteen.

Career

With the release of Reflections in late 2019, it includes both original material as well as Nashville Tunesmiths songs.

Brunet's 2017 album, It Don't Get Better Than This, is a mix of traditional country music, country rock, and Americana.

Brunet writes songs regularly and has performed hundreds of shows a year.

He names the Eagles, Poco, Loggins and Messina, and the Birds as some of his musical influences.

Discography

Albums
Reflections (2019)
It Don't Get Better Than This (2017)
Life Goes On (2002)
Me and My Guitar (1993)

Singles

References

External links
Official site
 https://www.facebook.com/normbrunetsingersongwriter/
 https://www.reverbnation.com/normbrunet
 https://twitter.com/norm_brunet
 https://www.youtube.com/channel/UCMg0ITnZq7Kqzk2er20kr1w/videos

1958 births
Living people
Canadian country singer-songwriters
Canadian male singer-songwriters
Musicians from Ottawa
Singers from Quebec